Allyne R. Ross (born 1946) is a senior United States district judge of the United States District Court for the Eastern District of New York.

Early life and education

Born in New York City, New York, Ross received a Bachelor of Arts degree from Wellesley College in 1967 and a Juris Doctor from Harvard Law School in 1970. She was a staff attorney to the Boston Legal Assistance Project from 1970 to 1971, and was in private practice of law in New York City from 1971 to 1976. She was an attorney in the United States Attorney's Office, Eastern District of New York, from 1976 to 1986, and was an Assistant United States Attorney from 1976 to 1983. She was in the Appeals Division from 1983 to 1986. She was a United States Magistrate of the United States District Court for the Eastern District of New York from 1986 to 1994.

Federal judicial service

On July 22, 1994, Ross was nominated by President Bill Clinton to a seat on the United States District Court for the Eastern District of New York vacated by I. Leo Glasser. Ross was confirmed by the United States Senate on September 28, 1994, and received her commission on September 29, 1994. She assumed senior status on April 5, 2011.

See also
List of Jewish American jurists

Sources

1946 births
Living people
Assistant United States Attorneys
Harvard Law School alumni
Judges of the United States District Court for the Eastern District of New York
Lawyers from New York City
United States district court judges appointed by Bill Clinton
United States magistrate judges
Wellesley College alumni
20th-century American judges
21st-century American judges
20th-century American women judges
21st-century American women judges